Peter Havlicek (born April 17, 1963 in Vienna) is an Austrian musician - Kontragitarre (viennese harp-guitar), jazz guitar, composition, vocals.

Life and career 
Havlicek studied classical and jazz guitar with Harry Pepl at the University of Music and Dramatic Arts Graz. He obtained the diploma for artistic jazz guitar in 1991. During his studies he founded the duo Steinberg and Havlicek together with the singer Traude Holzer.  Havlicek also participated in founding the Quartett Neue Wiener Concert Schrammeln in 1994 and the group Des Ano in 2000.

Peter Havlicek is dedicated to the renewal of the Viennese music and its combination with classic and jazz since the beginning of his musical career.

Peter Havlicek appeared at the Burgtheater, the Volksoper, the Volkstheater and the Theater in der Josefstadt in Vienna, and with Robert Meyer, Karlheinz Hackl, André Heller, Michael Heltau, Karl Markovic, Wolfgang Böck, Hansi Lang, Ed Thigpen, Benny Bailey, Karl Hodina, Trude Mally, Karl Ferdinand Kratzl, Bodo Hell and many others.

Diskografie 
Peter Havlicek
 Schrammel und die Jazz, 2013  non food factory
assisted by: Neue Wiener Concert Schrammeln, Karl Hodina, Steinberg und Havlicek, zwiefoch +, Agnes Palmisano, Roland Sulzer, Agnes Heginger, Andreas Schreiber, Trio Stippich - Havlicek, Michael Schober, Paul Skrepek jr.

Karl Hodina - Tini Kainrath - Peter Havlicek
 Geborgene Schätze, 2017 non food factory

Steinberg und Havlicek
 steinberg und havlicek 1997 kos rec.
 unhamlich leicht 2000 non food factory
 HIMMEL UND HÖLL, 2002 non food factory
 Alles Gute, 2010 non food factory

Neue Wiener Concert Schrammeln
 Neue Wiener Concert Schrammeln 1997 kos rec.
 Vitamin Qu 1999 kos rec.
 Kronprinz Rudolf 2000 non food factory
 TANZ, 2001 Preiser Records
 Auf der Rennbahn, 2004 Preiser Records
 ZAMONA, 2007 non food factory
 KRONJUWELEN, 2012 non food factory

Robert Meyer und die Neuen Wiener Concert Schrammeln
 Tannhäuser in 80 Minuten, 2008 Phoenix Edition (DVD)

Otto Brusatti and the Neuen Wiener Concert Schrammeln
 Der Herr Karl, 2008 Astormedia

DES ANO
 Rafnschdecha, 2001 Preiser Records
 paradies, 2002 Preiser Records
 kleiner mann, 2008 non food factory
 film noir,  2009 ORF

Agnes Palmisano, Roland Sulzer, Peter Havlicek
 Wienerley, 2003 Preiser Records
 WIENER HALBWELTEN, Hinter-, Unter- und Abgründe des Wiener Liedes, 2005 non food factory
 Die wahre Liebe, 2012 non food factory

Zwiefoch+
 3 für Weihnachten und eins für Silvester, 2006 non food factory

Palmina Waters
 wheels of time 2000 palmenreich prod.

Adi Hirschal & Wolfgang Böck
 Schwoazze Luft strizzihimmelfahrt, 2000 BMG Ariola

Literatur 
Clemens Fabry: Neue Wiener Concert Schrammeln 
Peter Havlicek: Schrammel und die Jazz, 12 Kompositionen, Notenbuch 52 Seiten

References

External links 
 Webpräsenz
 Concertschrammeln
 Steinberg und Havlicek
 Peter Havlicek
 http://www.harpguitars.net/players/kontra/kontra_players.htm
 http://events.diepresse.com/cont/events/detail.aspx?eventid=1298352&date=24.03.2010%2019:30:00
 http://www.sra.at/person/28407
 http://db.musicaustria.at/node/30666
 http://www.lotusrecords.at/index.php?id=30&backPID=11&tt_products=5777
 https://cms.falter.at/falter/rezensionen/buecher/?issue_id=591&item_id=0717281912877

1963 births
Living people
Austrian jazz guitarists
Male guitarists
Austrian jazz composers
Male jazz composers
20th-century Austrian male singers
Musicians from Vienna
21st-century Austrian male singers